Soleyman may refer to:

Soleyman II, Persian ruler
Soleyman Binafard (b. 1933), Iranian sport wrestler
Soleyman, Khuzestan, a village in Khuzestan Province, Iran
Soleyman, South Khorasan, a village in South Khorasan Province, Iran
Soleyman District, an administrative subdivision of Razavi Khorasan Province, Iran
Soleyman Rural District, an administrative subdivision of Razavi Khorasan Province, Iran

See also
Sulaiman (disambiguation)
Solomon (disambiguation)
King Soloman